The 1975 European Cup was the 5th edition of the European Cup of athletics.

The Finals were held in Nice, France.

Final
Held in Nice on 16 and 17 August for both men and women.

Team standings

Results summary

Men's events

Women's events

Semifinals

Men
All semifinals were held on 12 and 13 July.

Semifinal 1
Held in Turin, Italy

Semifinal 2
Held in London, United Kingdom

Semifinal 3
Held in Leipzig, East Germany

Women
All semifinals were held on 12 July.

Semifinal 1
Held in Lüdenscheid, West Germany

Semifinal 2
Held in Sofia, Bulgaria

Semifinal 3
Held in Budapest, Hungary

Preliminaries

Men
All preliminaries were held on 14 and 15 June. First three teams advanced to the semifinals.

Preliminary 1
Held in Lisbon, Portugal

Preliminary 2
Held in Athens, Greece

Women
All preliminaries were held on 14 June. First three teams advanced to the semifinals.

Preliminary 1
Held in Madrid, Spain

Preliminary 2
Held in Osijek, Yugoslavia

References

External links
European Cup results (Men) from GBR Athletics
European Cup results (Women) from GBR Athletics

European Cup (athletics)
European Cup
1975 in French sport
International athletics competitions hosted by France